"Against the Wind" is Máire Brennan's first solo single, taken from her 1992 album Máire. Two covers were made available, one with a sand pattern and the title of the single, the other with a photograph by Tim Jarvis, of Máire and three dancers, superimposed on the sand pattern. A promotional video directed by the Douglas Brothers was made to accompany the single.

The song also appears on Moya Brennan's 2005 live album Óró - A Live Session and on 2008's Heart Strings.

Track listing 
7" Vinyl & Cassette
"Against the Wind" (edit)
"She Moved Through the Fair"

Compact Disc
"Against the Wind" (edit)
"She Moved Through the Fair"
"Against the Wind" (album version)

References

1992 debut singles
1992 songs
RCA Records singles